Capitol Theatre, Passaic, NJ, 4/25/77 is a live album by the rock band the Grateful Dead.  It contains the complete concert recorded at the Capitol Theatre in Passaic, New Jersey on April 25, 1977.  It was produced as a four-disc vinyl LP, in a limited edition of 7,700 copies, and released on April 16, 2016, in conjunction with Record Store Day.

The same concert recording was also released in October 2015, as part of the 30 Trips Around the Sun box set.

Track listing
Side 1
First set:
"New Minglewood Blues" (traditional, arranged by Grateful Dead) – 6:12
"Deal" (Jerry Garcia, Robert Hunter) – 5:41
"Mama Tried" (Merle Haggard) – 3:07
"They Love Each Other" (Garcia, Hunter) – 7:17
Side 2 
"Looks Like Rain" (Bob Weir, John Barlow) – 8:33
"Peggy-O" (traditional, arranged by Grateful Dead) – 9:16
Side 3
"Lazy Lightning" > (Weir, Barlow) – 3:32
"Supplication" (Weir, Barlow) – 3:58
"Ship of Fools" (Garcia, Hunter) – 6:40
"Estimated Prophet" (Weir, Barlow) – 7:59
Side 4
"Brown-Eyed Women" (Garcia, Hunter) – 6:06
"The Music Never Stopped" (Weir, Barlow) – 6:46
Encore:
"U.S. Blues" (Garcia, Hunter) – 6:33
Side 5
Second set:
"Scarlet Begonias" > (Garcia, Hunter) – 8:52
"Fire on the Mountain" (Mickey Hart, Hunter) – 11:08
Side 6
"Samson and Delilah" (traditional, arranged by Grateful Dead) – 7:55
"Terrapin Station" (Garcia, Hunter) – 9:37
Side 7
"Playing in the Band" > (Weir, Hart, Hunter) – 9:23
"Drums" (Hart, Bill Kreutzmann) – 4:12
Side 8
"Wharf Rat" > (Garcia, Hunter) – 17:34
"Playing in the Band" (Weir, Hart, Hunter) – 3:31

Personnel
Grateful Dead
Jerry Garcia – guitar, vocals
Donna Jean Godchaux – vocals
Keith Godchaux – keyboards
Mickey Hart – drums
Bill Kreutzmann – drums
Phil Lesh – electric bass
Bob Weir – guitar, vocals
Production
Produced by Grateful Dead
Produced for release by David Lemieux
Executive producer: Mark Pinkus
Associate producers: Doran Tyson, Ivette Ramos
Recording: Betty Cantor-Jackson
Mastering: David Glasser
Tape-to-digital transfers: John K. Chester, Jamie Howarth
Lacquer cutting: Chris Bellman
Cover illustration: Tony Millionaire
Art direction, design: Steve Vance
Tape research: Michael Wesley Johnson
Archival research: Nicholas Meriwether

References

Grateful Dead live albums
2016 live albums
Passaic, New Jersey
Rhino Entertainment live albums